Moderately prosperous society or Xiaokang society, is a Chinese term, originally of Confucianism, used to describe a society composed of a functional middle-class. In December 1979, Deng Xiaoping, then paramount leader of China, first proposed the idea of "Xiaokang" based on the "Four Modernizations".

The term is best known in recent years through its use by Hu Jintao, General Secretary of the Chinese Communist Party between 2002 and 2012, when referring to economic policies intended to realise a more equal distribution of wealth. In the usages (Tifa) of current General Secretary Xi Jinping, the term "Chinese Dream" has gained somewhat greater prominence. During the annual National Party Congress meeting of 2015, Xi unveiled a set of political slogans called the Four Comprehensives, which include "Comprehensively build a moderately prosperous society."

Origins 
It has been loosely translated as a "basically well-off" society in which the people are able to live relatively comfortably, albeit ordinarily. The term was first used in Classic of Poetry written as early as 3,000 years ago. Xiaokang may be associated with an Engel's coefficient of 40-50 percent.

Modern political discourse 

Chinese leader Deng Xiaoping used the terms Xiaokang society in 1979 as the eventual goal of Chinese modernization.  

The vision of a xiaokang society is one in which most people are moderately well off and middle class, and in which economic prosperity is sufficient to move most of the population in mainland China into comfortable means, but in which economic advancement is not the sole focus of society.  Explicitly incorporated into the concept of a Xiaokang society is the idea that economic growth needs to be balanced with sometimes conflicting goals of social equality and environmental protection.

The revival of the concept of a Xiaokang Society was in part a criticism of social trends in mainland China in the 1990s under Jiang Zemin, in which many in China felt was focusing too much on the newly rich and not enough on mainland China's rural poor.  Furthermore, there has been a fear in some circles that Chinese society has become too materialistic placing material wealth above all other social needs.

In contrast to previous concepts such as the spiritual civilization and the campaigns against bourgeois liberalization in the 1980s, the concept of the Xiaokang society does not involve heroic self-sacrifice and does not place the material and the spiritual in opposition.  The vision of a Xiaokang society sees the need for economic growth to provide prosperity, but it sees the need for this prosperity to be broadly distributed.

In addition, the concept of a Xiaokang society is the first time in which the Chinese Communist Party has used a classical Chinese concept to legitimize its vision for the future of China. Its recent use has been associated with Hu Jintao and Wen Jiabao as a goal for mainland China to reach by the year 2020.

Xiaokang is also a name for a semi-monthly magazine that is affiliated to the Qiushi Magazine, the party-run magazine in Beijing. Started in 2004, it mainly focuses on the political and economic development in China. Referring to itself as "Insight China", Xiaokang defines itself as a magazine that voices public opinions and discuss the current affairs regarding the Chinese Politics and social cultures.

Common prosperity 
Common prosperity is also focused on prosperity of society, a fundamental issue in Chinese politics, but its not related to MPS despite the focus on prosperity.

See also
 Buddhist economics
 Harmonious Society
 Real socialism
 Sufficiency economy

References

Politics of China
Society of China
Deng Xiaoping
Political ideologies
Confucianism
Ideology of the Chinese Communist Party